La nuova squadra is an Italian television series.

See also
List of Italian television series

External links
 

Naples in fiction
Italian television series
2008 Italian television series debuts
2011 Italian television series endings
2000s Italian television series
2010s Italian television series